A by-election was held for the Australian House of Representatives seat of Boothby on 24 May 1941. This was triggered by the death of United Australia Party (UAP) MP John Price.

The by-election was won by UAP candidate Grenfell Price, who was not related to his predecessor.

Results

References

1941 elections in Australia
South Australian federal by-elections